Gomphocarpus is a genus of plants in the family Apocynaceae first described as a genus in 1810. It is widespread across much of Africa, with a few species naturalized in other regions.

Species accepted

References

 
Apocynaceae genera